Tanderlu or Tondarlu may refer to:
 Tanderlu, East Azerbaijan
 Tondarlu, West Azerbaijan